TBB may refer to:

Organizations
 Telekom Baskets Bonn, a German professional basketball team
 Tennis Borussia Berlin, a German football club
 Turkish Banks Association, Türkiye Bankalar Birliği
 Turkish Bars Association, Türkiye Barolar Birliği
TBB pank, commercial bank in Estonia

Other uses 
 Main-Tauber-Kreis, Tauberbischofsheim, code used on German vehicle registration plates
 Threading Building Blocks, a software library developed by Intel Corporation
 Thunersee–Beatenberg Bahn, a funicular in the Swiss canton of Bern
 Tor Browser Bundle, a set of software for browsing the Internet over the Tor network
 The Brady Bunch, American television show
 IATA code for Dong Tac Airport
 Tampa Bay Buccaneers, a professional American football franchise founded in 1976
 Tbb - Trypanosoma brucei brucei, a parasite of livestock and wildlife